Expedition 37 was the 37th expedition to the International Space Station.

Crew

Sources
NASA, ESA

References

External links

NASA's Space Station Expeditions page

Expeditions to the International Space Station
2013 in spaceflight